Yesterday, Today & Tomorrow may refer to:

 Yesterday, Today & Tomorrow (Billy Butler album), 1970
 Yesterday, Today & Tomorrow (Gene Harris album), 1973
 Yesterday, Today & Tomorrow (K-the-I??? album),  2008
 Yesterday, Today, & Tomorrow (Spinners album),  1977
 Yesterday, Today, and Tomorrow (Bill Anderson album), 1984
 Yesterday, Today and Tomorrow, a 1963 Italian film
 Yesterday, Today, Tomorrow (film), a 2011 Filipino film
 Yesterday, Today, Tomorrow, a 1997 album by Kenny Loggins
 Brunfelsia pauciflora, a purple flower with the common name 'yesterday-today-and-tomorrow'
"Yesterday, Today And Tomorrow", a song by Small Faces from their 1967 album From the Beginning